Commatica extremella is a moth in the family Gelechiidae. It was described by Francis Walker in 1864. It is found in Amazonas, Brazil.

Adults are dark cupreous brown, the forewings with a slender silvery streak, which extends from three-fourths of the length of the costa to the end of the exterior border. There is a white point at the tip of the costa. The hindwings are very narrow.

References

Commatica
Moths described in 1864